The following is a list of Miraflores District's mayors in Lima Province, Peru, through the 19th, 20th and 21st centuries.

 1866: Francisco de la Cruz Marmolefo.
 1881: Guillermo Scheel.
 1881: Tomás Carbajal.
 1882-1883: chilean invasion of Lima.
 1884-1886: Pedro F. Denegri.
 1886-1889: Enrique F. Revett.
 1889: Carlos Sotomayor.
 1889-1890: Javier Conroy
 1891-1893: José A. Larco.
 1893-1895: Eleodoro Romero.
 1895-1897: Javier Conroy.
 1897-1903: Augusto Angulo.
 1903-1908: Enrique F. Revett.
 1908-1909: Leonidas Cáceres Menacho.
 1910: Belisario Suárez.
 1910-1912: Juan A. Figari.
 1912-1913: Francisco Tudela y Varela.
 1913: Luis Gonzáles del Riego.
 1913-1915: Francisco Tudela y Varela.
 1915-1917: Genaro Castro Iglesias.
 1918: Jorge A. Bucley.
 1918-1919: Luis Gonzáles del Riego.
 1919-1920: Alfredo Álvarez Calderón.
 1920-1922: Nicolás Salazar Orfila.
 1922-1924: Luis Arias Schreiber.
 1924-1925: Sebastián Salinas Cossío.
 1925-1927: Manuel B. Sayán Palacios.
 1927: Alejandro J. Figari.
 1927-1929: Guillermo Correa Elías.
 1930-1933: Luis Gallo Porras.
 1934-1937: Eduardo Villena Rey.
 1937-1938: Emilio Fort.
 1938-1939: Eduardo Villena Rey.
 1940-1942: Daniel Russo.
 1942-1944: Carlos Alzamora.
 1945-1946: Guillermo Ureta del Solar.
 1946-1947: Alicia Cox de Larco
 1948-1949: Julio César Gonzáles La Hoz.
 1950-1951: Emilio Hart Terré.
 1952-1955: Ivan H. Blume.
 1956: Augusto Leguía Ross.
 1956: Ernesto Araujo Álvarez Reyna.
 1957: Juan Bautista Isola.
 1957-1959: Carlos Alzamora Traverso.
 1959-1961: Emilio Rodríguez Larraín.
 1961-1963: Emilio Rodríguez Larraín
 1964-1966: Mario Cabrejos Quiñonez.
 1967: Juan José Vega.
 1967-1969: Rafael Sánchez Aizcorbe.
 1970-1976: Ernesto Aramburú Menchaca.
 1976: Santos Hinostroza.
 1976-1977: Carlos Arca Betancourt.
 1977-1978: Guillermo Schwarztman.
 1978-1979: César de Cárdenas Rovaretto.
 1979: Carlos Drago Garibaldi.
 1979: Julio Balbuena Camino.
 1979-1980: Guillermo López Mavila.
 1980: Carlos Cobilich Portocarrero.
 1980: Luis Dorich Torres.
 1981-1983: Jorge Rodríguez Larraín Pendergast.
 1984-1986: Luis Bedoya de Vivanco.
 1987-1989: Luis Bedoya de Vivanco.
 1990-1992: Alberto Andrade Carmona.
 1993-1995: Alberto Andrade Carmona.
 1996-1998: Fernando Andrade Carmona.
 1999-2001: Luis Bedoya de Vivanco.
 2001-2002: German Kruguer
 2002-2006: Fernando Andrade Carmona.
 2007-2010: Manuel Masías Oyanguren.
 2011-2018: Jorge Vicente Martín Muñoz Wells
 2019-2022: Luis Alfonso Molina Arles

Miraflores